Žemberovce is a village and municipality in the Levice District in the Nitra Region of Slovakia.

History
In historical records the village was first mentioned in 1256.

Geography
The village lies at an altitude of 226 metres and covers an area of 29.515 km². It has a population of about 1240 people.

Ethnicity
The village is approximately 99% Slovak.

Facilities
The village has a public library, football pitch and a gym.

External links
http://www.statistics.sk/mosmis/eng/run.html

Villages and municipalities in Levice District